Ospedaletto (Ospedaléto in local dialect) is a comune (municipality) in Trentino in the northern Italian region of Trentino-Alto Adige/Südtirol, located about  east of Trento.

Ospedaletto borders the following municipalities: Pieve Tesino, Cinte Tesino, Ivano-Fracena, Villa Agnedo, Grigno and Asiago.

Demographic evolution

References 

Cities and towns in Trentino-Alto Adige/Südtirol